Teenage Mutant Ninja Turtles is a comic book published by Dreamwave Productions in 2003. The first four stories are based on episodes of the 2003 Teenage Mutant Ninja Turtles television series, but told from the view of supporting characters, before the creation of new stories, just as the original issues of TMNT Adventures followed the 1987 TV series before developing new stories.

The series ran for seven issues before it was cancelled as Dreamwave went out of business.

References

Dreamwave Productions titles
Dreamwave Productions